The 1946 NFL Championship Game  was the 14th annual championship game of the National Football League (NFL), played December 15 at the Polo Grounds in New York City, with a record-breaking attendance of 

The game matched the New York Giants (7–3–1), champions of the Eastern Division, against the Western Division champion Chicago Bears (8–2–1). The Giants had won the regular season game  at the Polo Grounds seven weeks earlier on October 27, but the Bears were seven to ten point 

This was the fifth and final NFL Championship game played at the Polo Grounds and the fourth of six meetings between the Bears and Giants in the title game.

Tied after three quarters, Chicago won 24–14 for their seventh NFL title, their fifth victory in eight NFL championship game appearances. The attendance record stood for another nine years, until the 1955 title game in Los Angeles.

Bribery scandal
The day before the game, two of the Giants' players, Frank Filchock and Merle Hapes, were accused of taking bribes to fix the game from Alvin Paris. Mayor William O'Dwyer subsequently informed Jack Mara, Wellington Mara and Bert Bell of the police evidence against the two.

Hours later, the four met at Gracie Mansion, and the mayor interviewed the players one at a time. Under questioning, Hapes admitted that he was offered a bribe, but Filchock denied being offered it.

Several hours later, Paris was arrested, and during his police interview made a full confession to bribing the players: Hapes was suspended by Bell, but Filchock was allowed to play. During Paris' trial weeks later, Filchock admitting taking the bribe under

Scoring summary
Sunday, December 15, 1946
Kickoff: 2 p.m. EST

First quarter
CHI – Ken Kavanaugh 21 yard pass from Sid Luckman (Frank Maznicki kick), 7–0 CHI
CHI – Dante Magnani 19 yard interception return (Maznicki kick), 14–0 CHI
NY  – Liebel 38 yard pass from Frank Filchock (Ken Strong kick), 14–7 CHI
Second quarter
No scoring
Third quarter
NY  – Steve Filipowicz 5 yard pass from Filchock (Strong kick), 14–14 TIE
Fourth quarter
CHI – Luckman 19 yard run (Maznicki kick), 21–14 CHI
CHI – FG Maznicki 26 yard, 24–14 CHI

Officials
Referee: Ronald Gibbs
Umpire: Carl Brubaker
Head Linesman: Charlie Berry
Field Judge: William Grimberg 

Players' shares
The gross receipts for the game, including radio and picture rights, was just under $283,000. Each player on the winning Bear team received $1,975, while Giants players made $1,295 each.

References

Championship Game
National Football League Championship games
Chicago Bears postseason
New York Giants postseason
Sports in Manhattan
NFL Championship Game
American football competitions in New York City
NFL Championship Game
1940s in Manhattan
Washington Heights, Manhattan